Mohammed Essam Mohammed (born on 1 Jan 1994) is an Egyptian football midfielder who plays for Trat in the Thai League 2.

Career
Essam joined Legia Warsaw II in May 2013. His contract was terminated in January 2014. In February it was announced that Essam was on trial for Finnish club FC Jazz.

He has previously played for Wadi Degla FC in the Egyptian Premier League. Essam has also been a member of the Egypt U-20 squad.

Later on, he went back to Egypt to join Ismaily SC and Al Nasr, before returning to Poland to play for Nadwiślan Góra, Stal Stalowa Wola and MKS Kluczbork. He later joined El-Entag El-Harby, Górnik Łęczna and Arab Contractors. In January 2021, he transferred to Bank Al Ahly for a transfer fee worth 2,5mln EGP.

Essam's show of skills in one of Bank Al Ahly's league matches angered the opponent Makkasa SC resulting in a controversial suspension imposed by his club and eventual free transfer to the Egyptian Premier League debutant Eastern Company.

References

External links

1994 births
Living people
Egyptian footballers
Egyptian expatriate footballers
Association football midfielders
Wadi Degla SC players
Ismaily SC players
Al Nasr SC (Egypt) players
Legia Warsaw II players
Stal Stalowa Wola players
MKS Kluczbork players
El Entag El Harby SC players
Górnik Łęczna players
Al Mokawloon Al Arab SC players
Mohamed Essam
I liga players
II liga players
Egyptian Premier League players
Egyptian expatriate sportspeople in Poland
Expatriate footballers in Poland
Mohamed Essam